The 2019 EAFF E-1 Football Championship was the 8th edition of the EAFF E-1 Football Championship, an international football tournament for East Asian countries and territories organized by the EAFF. The finals were held in South Korea in December 2019. It was the nation's third time hosting the tournament.

Teams
Ten teams were allocated to their particular stage. Each winner of the preliminary round progressed to the next stage.

Venues

Tiebreakers
The ranking of teams was determined as follows:
Points in head-to-head matches among tied teams;
Goal difference in head-to-head matches among tied teams;
Goals scored in head-to-head matches among tied teams;
If more than two teams are tied, and after applying all head-to-head criteria above, a subset of teams are still tied, all head-to-head criteria above are reapplied exclusively to this subset of teams;
Goal difference in all group matches;
Goals scored in all group matches;
Penalty shoot-out if only two teams are tied and they met in the last round of the group;
Disciplinary points (yellow card = 1 point, red card as a result of two yellow cards = 3 points, direct red card = 3 points, yellow card followed by direct red card = 4 points);
Drawing of lots.

First preliminary round
The first preliminary round was held in Mongolia in September 2018.

Table

Matches
All times are local (UTC+8).

Awards

Second preliminary round
The second preliminary round was held in Taiwan in November 2018.

Table

Matches

All times are local (UTC+8).

Awards

Final round

The final round was held in Busan, South Korea between 10 and 18 December 2019.

Squads

Table

Matches

All times are local (UTC+9).

Awards

Goalscorers

3 goals

 Koki Ogawa

2 goals

 Hwang In-beom

1 goal

 Dong Xuesheng
 Ji Xiang
 Zhang Xizhe
 Genta Miura

 Daiki Suga
 Musashi Suzuki
 Kyosuke Tagawa
 Kim Min-jae

 Na Sang-ho

Final ranking

Per statistical convention in football, matches decided in extra time are counted as wins and losses, while matches decided by penalty shoot-out are counted as draws.

Broadcasting rights
 – CCTV-5+, PPTV
 – KGTF
 – Cable TV, Fantastic Television
 – Fuji TV
 – TDM
 – MNB
 NMI – KTGM
 – KCTV
 – SPOTV, MBN (South Korean male national team matches only)

References

2019
Eaff
International association football competitions hosted by South Korea
Eaff E-1 Football Championship
Eaff